Peter Kirk may refer to:

 Peter Kirk (businessman) (1860–1916), British-born American mill-owner, founder of the City of Kirkland, Washington, USA
 Sir Peter Kirk (English politician) (1928–1977), British Conservative MP and government minister
 Peter Kirk (MP for Carrickfergus) (1800–1856), UK MP from the Irish constituency of Carrickfergus 1835–1847
 Peter Kirk (director) (born 1969), Australian film director

Characters
Peter Kirk, a character in The Grudge
Peter Kirk, nephew of James T. Kirk in the fictional Star Trek universe